Luciano Nobili (30 January 1933 – 10 December 2016) was an Italian footballer.

References

1933 births
2016 deaths
Sportspeople from Reggio Emilia
Association football defenders
Palermo F.C. players
A.C. Reggiana 1919 players
Delfino Pescara 1936 players
Italian footballers
Footballers from Emilia-Romagna